Articles about the Bombings of North Vietnam during the Vietnam War include:
Proposed bombing of Vietnam's dikes
Operation Rolling Thunder, 1965–1968
Operation Linebacker, May–October 1972
Operation Linebacker II,  December 1972